The Serbian men's national 3x3 team ( / Muška reprezentacija Srbije u basketu) represents Serbia in international 3x3 basketball matches and is controlled by the Basketball Federation of Serbia.

Honours

Individual awards
 FIBA World Cup MVP
 Dušan Domović Bulut – 2016, 2018
 Dejan Majstorović – 2017, 2022
 FIBA World Cup All-Tournament Team
 Dušan Domović Bulut – 2016, 2017, 2018
 Dejan Majstorović – 2017, 2022
 FIBA 3x3 Europe Cup MVP
 Dušan Domović Bulut – 2018
 Miroslav Pašajlić – 2021
 Dejan Majstorović – 2022
 FIBA 3x3 Europe Cup All-Tournament Team
 Dušan Domović Bulut – 2018
Miroslav Pašajlić – 2021

Competitions

Summer Olympics

World Cup

Europe Cup

European Games

Mediterranean Games

Team

Current roster
The following is the Serbia roster for the 2020 Summer Olympics.

See also
 Serbia women's national 3x3 team
 Serbia men's national under-18 3x3 team
 Serbia men's national basketball team

References

External links
 

Men's national 3x3 basketball teams
3
3x3 basketball in Serbia